Hamad Ndee (born 15 May 1951) is a Tanzanian sprinter. He competed in the men's 200 metres at the 1972 Summer Olympics.

References

1951 births
Living people
Athletes (track and field) at the 1972 Summer Olympics
Tanzanian male sprinters
Olympic athletes of Tanzania
Place of birth missing (living people)